Have I Got News for You (HIGNFY) is a British television panel show produced by Hat Trick Productions for the BBC. Episodes were originally aired on BBC Two between September 1990 to June 2000, before being aired on BBC One since October 2000. As of 4 November 2022, the programme has aired 570 episodes across 64 series, plus two exclusive-to-video editions, three Comic Relief crossovers with fellow BBC panel shows and a 60-minute live webcast version, also for Comic Relief. The list also includes the compilation episodes produced for the programme – those made between 1995 and 2001, and from 2010 onwards.

All episodes include details on the guest panellists who featured on each team – captained by Ian Hislop and Paul Merton (unless otherwise noted) – the scores achieved, and, since the third episode of Series 24 after the dismissal of its former host Angus Deayton, the guest host that presented the programme.

Episode list

The following lists the episodes of HIGNFY per series, including guest panellists for each team, scores, and, since the third episode of the 24th series, the host for that corresponding episode. The coloured backgrounds denote the result of each of the shows:
 – indicates Ian's team won
 – indicates Paul's team won
 – indicates the game ended in a draw

Series 1 (1990)

Series 2 (1991)

1992 General Election Special (1992)

Series 3 (1992)

Series 4 (1992)

Have I Got A Question of Sport for You (1993)

Series 5 (1993)

Series 6 (1993)

Series 7 (1994)

Series 8 (1994)

Series 9 (1995)

Have I Got Unbroadcastable News for You (1995)

Series 10 (1995)

Series 11 (1996)

Series 12 (1996)

Series 13 (1997)

Series 14 (1997)

The Official Pirate Video (1997)

Series 15 (1998)

Series 16 (1998)

Have I Got Buzzcocks All Over (1999)

Series 17 (1999)

Series 18 (1999)

Series 19 (2000)

Series 20 (2000)

Have I Got Buzzcocks All Over (2001)

Series 21 (2001)

Series 22 (2001)

Series 23 (2002)

Series 24 (2002)

Series 25 (2003)

Series 26 (2003)

Series 27 (2004)

Series 28 (2004)

Series 29 (2005)

Series 30 (2005)

Series 31 (2006)

Series 32 (2006)

Series 33 (2007)

Series 34 (2007)

Series 35 (2008)

Series 36 (2008)

Series 37 (2009)

Series 38 (2009)

Series 39 (2010)

Series 40 (2010)

Comic Relief live special (2011)

Series 41 (2011)

Series 42 (2011)

Series 43 (2012)

Series 44 (2012)

Series 45 (2013)

Series 46 (2013)

Series 47 (2014)

Series 48 (2014)

Series 49 (2015)

Series 50 (2015)

Series 51 (2016)

Series 52 (2016)

Series 53 (2017)

Series 54 (2017)

Series 55 (2018)

Series 56 (2018)

Series 57 (2019)

Series 58 (2019)

Series 59 (2020)

Series 60 (2020)

Series 61 (2021)

Series 62 (2021)

Series 63 (2022)

Series 64 (2022)

Series 65 (2023)

Scores

Footnotes

References

External links
Have I Got News for You BBC Episode Guide

Lists of British comedy television series episodes
Lists of British non-fiction television series episodes